Tricholochmaea rufosanguinea is a species of skeletonizing leaf beetle or flea beetle in the family Chrysomelidae. It is found in North America.

References

Further reading

 
 
 

Galerucinae
Beetles described in 1826
Taxa named by Thomas Say